Projapoti is a 2022 Indian Bengali-language family drama film directed by Avijit Sen, produced by Atanu Raychaudhuri (Bengal Talkies) and distributed by SSR Cinemas . The film features Mithun Chakraborty, Mamata Shankar and Dev in lead roles. The movie was theatrically released on 23rd December 2022. Made on a budget of 1.5 Crores , it was a master hit at the box-office.The film is still running in most of the cinemas in West Bengal. The film was a  blockbuster.

Cast 
 Mithun Chakraborty as Gour Chakraborty
 Dev as Joy Chakraborty, Gour's son
 Mamata Shankar as Kusum
 Shweta Bhattacharya as Mala, Joy's girlfriend 
 Koushani Mukherjee as Jayashri, Kusum's daughter 
 Koneenica Banerjee  as Gour's daughter
 Ambarish Bhattacharya as Gour's son-in-law 
 Kharaj Mukherjee as Gour's neighbour and friend
 Biswanath Basu as Joy's office colleague

Reception  
A critic from The Times of India wrote that "As holiday releases go, Projapoti brings a lot to the table, be it in terms of cast, story or a family-friendly viewing experience and audiences wouldn't be remiss if they walked into the theatre for this, especially if they’ve ever been Mithun fans". A critic from OTT Play wrote that "Projapoti is an outright entertainer and it will not let you down in terms of entertainment. It makes you laugh and cry". Shatarupa Bose reviewing in Anandabazar Patrika praised the performances of Chakraborty and Dev along with other cast, music, cinematography, screenplay and dialogues and noted that melodrama at the end of the movie could have been toned down.

Awards
 2023: WBFJA Award for Best Popular Film 
 2023: WBFJA Award for Best Actor (Popular Choice)- Mithun Chakraborty
 2023: WBFJA Award for Best Actor (Critic's Choice) - Dev Adhikari
 2023: WBFJA Award for  Best Comedian- Kharaj Mukherjee
 2023: Filmfare Awards East for Best Actor- Mithun Chakraborty
 2023: Filmfare Awards East for Best Supporting Actress- Mamata Shankar

Controversy
After the release of the film, it was not allowed to be shown in Nandan Cinema Hall, in Kolkata, which is being operated by Government of West Bengal. Netizens replied that as the leading actor of the film Mithun Chakraborty is an active member of Bharatiya Janata Party, the show has been cancelled. Following the decision of show cancellation, leading actor of the film Dev reacted by a post. In the post, Dev regretted for cancelling the shows of his film. However, senior Trinamool Congress leader Kunal Ghosh said that this film would not be able to run in the theatres because of Mithun. In reply to that, Dev reacted to do more films again with Mithun, and advised Kunal not to interfere in films. BJP leader Dilip Ghosh regretted that the movie has not been released in Nandan, because Mithun is an active member and supporter of BJP.

Box-Office
The film was collected 12 crores at the box-office, but 5 crores was the satelight rights which was acquired by Zee Bangla. So Projapoti is declared  Theatrical super hit .

References

External links
 

Bengali-language Indian films
2020s Bengali-language films
Indian drama films
Films produced by Dev (Bengali actor)